The 2019 Córdoba Open was a men's tennis tournament played on outdoor clay courts. It was the 1st edition of the Córdoba Open (replacing the Ecuador Open Quito), and part of the ATP Tour 250 series of the 2019 ATP Tour. It took place at the Estadio Mario Alberto Kempes in Córdoba, Argentina, from 4 February through 10 February 2019. Unseeded Juan Ignacio Londero, who entered on a wildcard, won the singles title.

Singles main-draw entrants

Seeds

1 Rankings are as of January 28, 2019

Other entrants
The following players received wildcards into the singles main draw:
  Carlos Berlocq 
  Juan Ignacio Londero 
  Thiago Seyboth Wild

The following players received entry from the qualifying draw:
  Facundo Bagnis
  Pedro Cachín 
  Alessandro Giannessi
  Andrej Martin

The following players received entry as lucky losers:
  Hugo Dellien
  Paolo Lorenzi

Withdrawals
  Taro Daniel → replaced by  Lorenzo Sonego
  Cristian Garín → replaced by  Hugo Dellien
  Dominic Thiem → replaced by  Paolo Lorenzi

Retirements
  Pablo Carreño Busta

Doubles main-draw entrants

Seeds

1 Rankings are as of January 28, 2019

Other entrants
The following pairs received wildcards into the doubles main draw:
  Facundo Argüello /  Pedro Cachín
  Facundo Bagnis /  Guillermo Durán

Withdrawals
During the tournament
  Pablo Carreño Busta

Champions

Singles 

  Juan Ignacio Londero def.  Guido Pella, 3–6, 7–5, 6–1

Doubles 

  Roman Jebavý /  Andrés Molteni def.  Máximo González /  Horacio Zeballos, 6–4, 7–6(7–4)

References

External links 
Official website

2019
2019 ATP Tour
2019 in Argentine tennis
February 2019 sports events in South America